O'Briens Irish Sandwich Cafe, also known as O'Briens, is an Irish franchise sandwich cafe chain founded in Ireland in 1988 by Brody Sweeney. As of October 2009, O'Briens was operated by the AIL Group.

Foundations
In 1988, Irish businessman, Brody Sweeney set up his first sandwich shop in Dublin. Sweeney reportedly chose the name O'Brien's because it was the most common name in the phone book and he wanted a very common Irish surname in the event of expansion overseas.

In 2009, the company went into liquidation and was purchased by Abrakebabra Investments Limited.

Initially operating only in Ireland, the chain once operated over 300 sandwich bars in Australia, China, Denmark, United Kingdom, Gibraltar, India, Indonesia, Bahrain, Malaysia, the Netherlands, Saudi Arabia, Singapore, Spain, Taiwan, and Thailand.

See also
List of Irish companies

References

External links
O'Briens Website

Restaurants in the Republic of Ireland
Fast casual restaurants
Fast-food chains of Ireland
Irish brands